Jabamani Tudu (born 10 April 2000) is an Indian footballer who plays as a defender for East Coast Railway and the India women's national football team.

Early life
Born in Mayurbhanj district, Odisha, Tudu was a part of the Odisha Sports Hostel. She has played in youth and senior football tournaments. She has also played for Odisha in national competitions, both youth and senior.

International career
Tudu represented India at the under-16 level during the 2015 AFC U-16 Championship qualifiers. In December 2016 Tudu was selected into the Indian senior side for the 2016 SAFF Women's Championship. She made her debut for the side on 2 January 2017 in their semi-final match against Nepal. She came on as a substitute for Dalima Chhibber as India won 3–1. She made her debut as a 15-year-old.

International goals

Honours

India
 SAFF Women's Championship: 2016, 2019
 South Asian Games Gold medal: 2019

Rising Students Club
 Indian Women's League: 2017–18

Odisha
 National Games Silver medal: 2022

Individual
 Indian Women's League Emerging Player: 2016–17

References

External links 
 Orisports profile
 Jabamani Tudu at All India Football Federation
 

Living people
2000 births
Indian women's footballers
People from Mayurbhanj district
Sportswomen from Odisha
Footballers from Odisha
India women's international footballers
India women's youth international footballers
Women's association football forwards
Sethu FC players
Indian Women's League players
South Asian Games gold medalists for India
South Asian Games medalists in football